Resett, also known as Resett.no, was a Norwegian online newspaper, which publisheed news and op-ed content. The website was launched in 2017 with Helge Lurås as editor-in-chief. Resett aimed to "present cases from a different angle than established mass media, and to cover news that other media do not want to cover". The newspaper closed operations in December 2022.

In July 2018, the newspaper claimed around  unique readers per day.

In June 2022, Maria Zähler became the editor-in-chief after Helge Lurås. When she was appointed, she declared that she wants to make Resett to "a center-right, realpolitik newspaper, with common sense as a guiding principle" and "to establish a decent newspaper on the right of Norwegian center". Maria Zähler is transgender, and has written about  her transgender experience.

In October 2022, Resett was bought by the Norwegian investor Petter Inge Remøy. Remøy stated that he wanted to save the economically challenged newspaper so that it can produce honest journalism.

Before Resett was established, Editor-in-chief Helge Lurås was a critic of Norwegian military campaigns abroad. His scepticism is also expressed in Resett in their published analysis of NRK's coverage of the civil war in Libya.

Resett states that it follows the Ethical Code of Practice for the Norwegian Press, but its application for membership in the established media organizations in Norway has been rejected.

Reception 

Political commentators in Dagsavisen and Dagbladet have argued that Resett routinely violates the Ethical Code of Practice, and that Resett must therefore be considered a political campaign and not a newspaper. A research report analyzing articles and comments in Resett found no clear violations of the Ethical Code of Practice.

In 2018, Resett published the "Grande" case; the female head of the Venstre political party reportedly had sex with an underage person at a wedding. Disclosing the name of a female perpetrator in a MeToo-related case was controversial at the time. Later, other newspapers also covered the case.
The editor-in-chief, Helge Lurås, also conveyed an offer of payment for the young man to step forward. The monetary offer was criticized as a breech of ethics.

References 

2017 establishments in Norway
Internet properties established in 2017